Gimpy is a derogatory descriptor of someone who has a limp. It may also refer to:

A person's nickname:
Lloyd Brown (baseball) (1904-1974), American Major League Baseball pitcher
Stephen Mowlam (born 1976), Australian field hockey goalkeeper
Dean O'Banion (1892-1924), Irish-American mobster and rival of Al Capone in the 1920s
Milt Pappas (born 1939), American Major League Baseball pitcher
Gwen Verdon (1925-2000), American actress and dancer whose childhood nickname was "Gimpy"

Fictional characters:
Gimpy, a main character in the animated television series Undergrads
"Gimpy" McHenry, protagonist of Manpower (1941 film), played by Edward G. Robinson
"Gimpy" Smith, a main character in Streets of New York (1939 film)
Colonel Gimpy, villain of Crack-Up (1936 film), played by Peter Lorre

Other uses:
Nickname for the General-purpose machine gun, particularly by the British armed forces

See also
"Gympie gympie" - colloquial name for the Australian "stinging brush" or Dendrocnide moroides

Lists of people by nickname